Geoffrey Squires (born 16 November 1942, in Derry, Northern Ireland) is an Irish poet who works in what might loosely be termed the modernist tradition.

Early life
While born in Derry, he grew up in County Donegal, Republic of Ireland. He read English at Cambridge, and gained a PhD in multi-media instructional systems in adult education from the University of Edinburgh in 1970. During his career, Squires translated poems that were written in the Persian language and French language. His early work was influenced by the poetry and poetics of Charles Olson.

Later life
Between the mid 1970s and mid 1990s, Squires wrote poetry and submitted education journal articles. By the 2000s, Squires began working for the University of Hull in charge of their education department while also working as a reader. He is now retired and lives in Hull. American poet and critic Robert Archambeau has described his work as 'a poetry of immediate consciousness'. His more recent writings show the effect of the study of Maurice Merleau-Ponty's theory of perception.

Works

Poetry
Sixteen Poems (1969)
Drowned Stones (1975)
Figures (1978)
XXI Poems (1980)
Landscapes & Silences (1996)
A Long Poem in Three Sections (1997)
This (1997)
Untitled and other poems 1975-2002 (2004)
Abstract Lyrics and Other Poems 2006-2012 (2012)
Poem at the Turn of the Year (2012)
Sans Titre, French translation of "Untitled III" (Editions Unes, 2013)
Paysages et Silences, French translation of "Landscapes & Silences" (Editions Unes, 2014)

Education related
Cognitive Styles and Adult Learning (1981)
The Analysis of Teaching (1982)
Innovation Through Recession (1983)
The Curriculum Beyond School (1987)
Teaching and Training (1988)
Pathways for Learning (1989)
First Degree: The Undergraduate Curriculum (1990)
Teaching as a Professional Discipline (1999)
Managing Your Learning (2002)
Trouble-Shooting Your Teaching (2002)

References

External links
An essay on Squires and two other poets

1942 births
Living people
Irish modernist poets
Male poets from Northern Ireland
Writers from Derry (city)
Male writers from Northern Ireland
21st-century writers from Northern Ireland